Jin Hyo-sang (born December 16, 1992), more commonly known by his stage name  Kidoh is a South Korean singer, rapper, composer, producer, DJ, and songwriter. He was a member of the South Korean boy band Topp Dogg, and the first Topp Dogg band member to release a solo album. He has been active member of South Korean hiphop crews called Rockbottom and Daenamhyup for several years.

Biography

Early years

Kidoh studied at the Hankuk University of Foreign Studies. Initially, Kidoh wanted to become a music producer. Later, he received a call from Brave Brothers, who influenced Kidoh to consider a more diverse musical career. Kidoh's career began in a trainee role with Big Hit Entertainment, in preparation for membership in the musical group BTS (방탄소년단).

Stardom Entertainment
Kidoh's first appearance with Topp Dogg was on the television show Show Champion, on October 22, 2013, performing a title that he produced (Say It, 말로해).

NEXTLEVEL Record Label
On May 10, 2017, Kidoh released a single "헐 (HER)" under the record label NEXTLEVEL. The full album "School of Hard Knocks" was planned to be released May 25, 2017, but was delayed until an unknown date.

Discography

Extended plays

Singles

References

External links

Interview (Topp Dogg website)
Video interview
Artist profile
 

1992 births
Living people
South Korean singer-songwriters
Musicians from Seoul
South Korean male idols
21st-century South Korean singers